PiYo is an 8-week exercise program that is a blend of Pilates and Yoga.  Developed by Chalene Johnson as part of The Beachbody Company, PiYo is marketed as a low-impact workout that strengthens and sculpts the body, and enhances flexibility.

References 

Yoga styles
Pilates
Exercise organizations
Exercise-related trademarks